Crow are an Australian rock band that is best known for three albums released in the 1990s. Founded by songwriters Peter Fenton and Peter Archer in Sydney in 1986, Crow ceased all activity in 1999, only to begin playing again in 2007. In 2009, they recorded an album of new material. Mixed by Jim Moginie (Midnight Oil), the album was released in 2010.

In 1998, the respected Australian music magazine Juice labeled Crow as the 'best band in Australia since The Birthday Party'. With releases on Phantom, Half A Cow, RooArt and BMG, Crow's evocative and influential music is widely acknowledged as having left an indelible mark upon the Australian musical landscape.

Biography

1988-1993: Early years & My Kind of Pain
From 1988 to 1992 Crow was a notoriously shambolic affair that could easily derail through equipment failures. Bringing performances to a jolting stop. Driven by the nervy personalities of brothers Peter (guitar, vocals) and John (drums) and combined with the combustible bassist Jim Woff and lead guitarist Peter Archer, Crow was highly unpredictable. The original bass player and founding member was Paul Gormack, who left the band just prior to the recording of the debut album.

Crow recorded their debut album My Kind of Pain in Chicago in 1992 with Steve Albini (Big Black) as producer. The record was subsequently re-mixed by local Tim Whitten before release. 

During that period, Crow supported many touring acts such as Straitjacket Fits, Pavement, Sebadoh and The Verlaines.

1994- 
The band signed by large local label RooArt who released their second album Li-Lo-ing in 1995. Guest musicians included Warren Ellis (Dirty Three) and Chris Abrahams (The Necks).

Richard Andrew (Underground Lovers, Registered Nurse) then replaced Andy Marks on drums. Extensive touring followed alongside bands such as Jeff Buckley.

Peter Archer then moved to Melbourne in 1996 to start a family and to pursue his own song writing vehicle Odette, leaving Crow without one of its real creators. 

Though the extraordinary talents of Chris Abrahams and Michael Christie were added on keyboards a more stripped back sound evolved and this is very evident on their last album, Play With Love in 1998. Though the said album received industry kudos it was not the necessary amount of sales support needed for a major label like BMG. Peter Fenton continued as a solo artist, releasing In the Lovers Arms album in 2004.

2007- : Reformation
In early 2007, the band began rehearsing for a show at Marrickville's (Sydney) "Cad Factory" performance space. During that performance - which drew heavily from the band's early work - Peter Fenton indicated that the show was the beginning of renewed band activity. Former drummer Andy Marks' new band, the Child Detectives, debuted before Crow's performance.

In August 2008 CROW played a show with Melbourne band HOSS. This was filmed as part of the 'That Then, This Now' series of shows featuring seminal Aussie bands, with the show set to be released on DVD.

2010 saw the release of their new album, Arcane. It features the 4 original band members, Peter Archer (Guitar and vocals), Peter Fenton (Guitar and vocals), Jim Woff (Bass) and John Fenton (Drums).

2010: Arcane
'Arcane' is the first Crow album was released in June 2010 on Nonzero Records. Mixed by Midnight Oil's Jim Moginie at Oceanic Studios, the album received very positive reviews."..they’ve got unfinished business to attend to, and based on this single alone, a whole lot more to say....'Ghost at the Crossroads' is truly up there among the band’s best material. It’s quintessential Crow, really: Those ominous opening chords; that perfect balance between light and shade; those spectral backing vocals in the chorus; Fenton’s pointed, inward-looking gaze...It’s like they’ve never left."

Current members
Peter Archer (Guitar and vocals)
Peter Fenton (Guitar and vocals)
Jim Woff (Bass)
Andy Marks (Drums)

Former members
Richard Andrew (Drums)
Paul Gormack (Bass)
Tina H Stevens (Drums)
Paul Ritchard (Drums)
John Fenton (Drums)
Chris Baz (Drums)
Michael Christie (Piano & Keyboards)
Chris Abrahams (Piano & Keyboards)

Discography

Albums

EPs

Awards and nominations

ARIA Music Awards
The ARIA Music Awards is an annual awards ceremony that recognises excellence, innovation, and achievement across all genres of Australian music. They commenced in 1987.

! 
|-
|1994
| My Kind of Pain
| ARIA Award for Best Adult Alternative Album
| 
|
|-

References

Australian rock music groups